Jon Burgerman is an English artist living in, New York, US.

Life and work
Jon Burgerman studied art foundation in Bournville, Birmingham, England. He graduated in fine art from Nottingham Trent University in 2001.

In 2008, he appeared as a guest on the BBC TV show: Blue Peter and in 2008 he was part of the original The Underbelly Project, which saw artists exhibit in a secret incomplete 100-year-old subway station deep underneath the streets of New York City.

The year 2008 also saw the publication by IDN of a 300-page monograph of Burgerman's work, Pens Are My Friends, whilst Kidrobot released the 14 piece mini figure vinyl toy collection "The Heroes of Burgertown".

Examples of Jon Burgerman's work are in the public collections of London's Victoria and Albert Museum and Science Museum.

Penguin Random House published Burgerman's first picture book SPLAT! in 2017. Chronicle Books published It's Great to Create in 2017  and Oxford University Press published Rhyme Crime in the UK. Laurence King Publishing published two of his books, Daily Doodle  and his coloring book Burgerworld.

The New York Times featured Burgerman in the Fashion & Style section of August 1, 2017  highlighting his Instagram stories and book It's Great to Create. In September 2017, filmmaker Bas Berkhout documented Burgerman's studio and family history in a short film called The Story of Jon Burgerman.

References

External links

Burgerman's Tumblr Girls project

English illustrators
Living people
English graphic designers
Place of birth missing (living people)
Year of birth missing (living people)
Alumni of Nottingham Trent University